Skilda världar (Worlds Apart) is a former Swedish soap opera originally airing from 1996 to 2002 about two families in Stockholm and their friends. One rich family and one poor and about Daniel and Sandra who are from the two families and fall in love. Later in the series it is discovered that Daniel and Sandra are twins. The series goes further and further away from their story and goes more towards the hate from all characters against Rebecka who is trying to destroy the relationship between Sandra and Daniel.

Skilda världar is one of TV4's most watched shows in history and was the longest running daily soap opera in Swedish television.  The series was based on the 1980s Australian soap opera, Sons and Daughters.

Main cast
Lars-Erik Berenett as Harald Bovallius (1996–98)
Hampus Björck as Mikael Toivonen (1996–2002) 
Matti Berenett as Tom Bovallius (1996–2002) 
Bengt Dahlqvist as Daniel Toivonen (1996–2002) 
Pia Oscarsson as Karin Toivonen (1996–2002) 
Tuva Novotny as Nora Strandberg (1996–99)
Gunnar Mosén as Matti Toivonen (1996–99)

References

External links

Swedish television soap operas
TV4 (Sweden) original programming
1996 Swedish television series debuts
2002 Swedish television series endings
Television series by Fremantle (company)